Philip Rooney (26 March 1907–6 March 1962) was an Irish writer. His work was part of the literature event in the art competition at the 1948 Summer Olympics.

Early life 
Rooney was born in Collooney, Ireland to school teachers Henry Rooney and Margaret Rooney (née Mulligan). He had at least two brothers and one sister. His education began at Camphill school and he later attended Mungret College.

Career 
Rooney worked as a bank clerk until the success of his first novel All out to win in 1935. From there, he continued to publish his works, sometimes under the name 'Frank Phillips'. He also worked in print journalism and broadcasting. For some time he was a radio critic for The Irish Times, before he moved to Radio Éireann (now Raidió Teilifís Éireann). In 1947 Rooney was named assistant to the head of general features of Radio Éireann, but decided to split his time between that and the BBC while continuing his career as a novelist.

Rooney's entry for the 1948 Summer Olympics was an excerpt from his novel Captain Boycott, which had been published in 1946.

Rooney was later the head of features for the Irish New Agency, before he rejoined Radio Éireann in 1953 as features editor and scriptwriter until 1961. When Telefís Éireann opened that year, Rooney was transferred to its drama department as chief script-editor.

Later life and death 
Rooney died in Dublin on 6 March 1962.

In popular culture 
Rooney's novel Captain Boycott was adapted for the screen in a film of the same name in 1947.

References

1907 births
1962 deaths
20th-century Irish male writers
Olympic competitors in art competitions
People from County Sligo